Krishnarajapura or K.R. Pura, officially Krishnarajapura, is a neighborhood of in North-Eastern Bangalore, the capital of the Indian state of Karnataka. It is one of the zones of BBMP. The Old Madras Road passes through this locality. A lake called 'Vengayyana Lake' is in the heart of this area. The Yele Mallappa Shetty Lake near Medahalli, situated just outside the eastern limits of KR Pura, is one of the largest lakes in Bangalore.

Krishnarajapura is also the headquarters of the Bangalore East taluk and houses certain central and state government offices. It is also a Karnataka Legislative Assembly constituency. B A Basvaraja of the Bharatiya Janata Party was elected as the Member of Legislative assembly from this constituency in the 2013 Karnataka Assembly election, and re-elected in 2018. The area is also a part of the Bangalore North Lok Sabha constituency.

The area was named after Krishnaraja Wadiyar III, who ruled the provincial state of Mysore from 1799 to 1869.

Connectivity
Krishnarajapuram is located at the junction of Old Madras Road and Outer Ring Road. The Krishnarajapuram Railway station falls on the Bangalore - Chennai broad gauge line. The cable bridge on the junction of Old Madras Road and Outer Ring Road was built by Afcons for IRCON and inaugurated the by then Prime Minister of India, Atal Bihari Vajpayee in 2003 and was subsequently declared as the Most Outstanding National Bridge by the Indian Institution of Bridge Engineers.

Demographics
 India census, Krishnarajapuram had a population of 187,453. Males constitute 52% of the population and females 48%. Krishnarajapuram has an average literacy rate of 78%, higher than the national average of 59.5%: male literacy is 83%, and female literacy is 71%. In Krishnarajapuram, 11% of the population is under 6 years of age.

References

Neighbourhoods in Bangalore